The Earth Shoe (also known as the Kalsø Earth Shoe) was an unconventional style of shoe invented circa 1957 by Danish yoga instructor and shoe designer Anna Kalsø. Its unique "negative heel technology" design featured a sole that was thinner at the heel than at the forefoot, so that when wearing them, one walked heel downward, as when walking in sand, with various claimed health benefits.           

In 1970, Raymond and Eleanor Jacobs founded the Earth Shoe company in the United States, after discovering Anna Kalsø and her negative-heel shoes in Copenhagen, Denmark. The shoes were introduced in New York City on April 1, 1970, three weeks before the first Earth Day.  The shoes quickly became a popular countercultural symbol of the 1970s. The company expanded to 123 stores to sell the shoes, boots, and sandals, all with the negative-heel design, across the United States, Canada, and Europe.  The shoes surged in popularity and were prominently featured on The Tonight Show Starring Johnny Carson and in Time magazine. Soon, other firms, including Roots Canada, also marketed similar negative-heel shoes.  Experts expressed varying opinions on whether the shoes were good or bad for one's feet.

By 1976 sales had grown to $14 million, but the company dissolved in 1977.  When the manufacturer of Kalsø Earth Shoes was unable to keep up with demand, franchise owners pursued litigation against the United States distributor. In 2001, Kalsø Earth Shoes re-surfaced after the rights to the name, technology and branded properties were purchased by Meynard Designs, Inc.  Subsequent reorganization of Meynard Designs led to the creation of Earth, Inc., as the manufacturing and marketing entity for Kalsø Earth Shoes.  They are not to be confused with the Earth Spirit shoe brand sold by Walmart, and others.

References

External links
 Current producers of Kalsø Earth Shoes

1970s fashion
Shoes